Sitkovo is a rural locality (a village) in Nikolotorzhskoye Rural Settlement, Kirillovsky District, Vologda Oblast, Russia. The population was 5 as of 2002.

Geography 
Sitkovo is located 32 km northeast of Kirillov (the district's administrative centre) by road. Levkovo is the nearest rural locality.

References 

Rural localities in Kirillovsky District